William Allen Trimble (April 4, 1786December 13, 1821) was a Democratic-Republican politician from Ohio. He served in the United States Senate.

Biography
Trimble was born in Woodford, Kentucky, the son of James and Jane (Allen) Trimble. He graduated from Transylvania College and was admitted to the bar in 1811. He briefly practiced law in Highland County, Ohio, from 1811 to 1812.

In the subsequent years he served in a variety of capacities, mostly with the Ohio militia and the U.S. Army in campaigns against the Pottawatomie Indians. He was a major of the Ohio Volunteers in 1812 and major of the Twenty-sixth United States Infantry in 1813. He was promoted to lieutenant colonel of the First United States Infantry in 1814. He was transferred to the Eighth United States Infantry in 1815 and served there until his resignation in 1819, following his election to the U.S. Senate for the term beginning in 1819.

Trimble served in the Senate until his death two years later. He died in Washington, D.C., on December 13, 1821 and is interred in the Congressional Cemetery in Washington, D.C.

See also
List of United States Congress members who died in office (1790–1899)

Notes

References
 Tuttle, Mary McArthur Thompson: "William Allen Trimble, United States Senator from Ohio." (July 1905). Ohio Archaeological and Historical Quarterly 14.

External links
 Retrieved on 2008-03-24

1786 births
1821 deaths
United States Army officers
United States senators from Ohio
Ohio lawyers
Ohio Democratic-Republicans
Democratic-Republican Party United States senators
United States Army personnel of the War of 1812
People from Woodford County, Kentucky
Transylvania University alumni
Burials at the Congressional Cemetery
19th-century American lawyers
People from Highland County, Ohio
19th-century American politicians